Stork Naked is a fantasy novel by British-American writer Piers Anthony, the thirtieth book of the Xanth series.

Plot
Surprise summons the stork with Umlaut, only to discover with dismay that the stork refuses to deliver her baby due to a clerical error. Off on an adventure to find her child, she seeks the aid of Pyra, who wields a tool that can find, and enter, alternate realities. As Surprise and her entourage search for the correct world, the sinister mechanism behind the whole adventure is revealed.

Characters  
Surprise Golem, daughter of Grundy Golem and Rapunzel Elf
Che Centaur, winged Centaur, tutor 
Pet Peeve, an insulting bird
Half-Demon Ted
Half-Demon Monica
Woe Betide, the child aspect of the Demoness Metria
Pyra

References

 30
2006 American novels
Tor Books books